NNSS may refer to:

 Navy Navigation Satellite System
 Nigerian Navy Secondary School
 Nevada National Security Site
Nach-Noten-Schluss-Syndrom